William McClean (born 21 January 1842, date of death unknown) was a Barbadian cricketer. He played in one first-class match for the Barbados cricket team in 1864/65.

See also
 List of Barbadian representative cricketers

References

External links
 

1842 births
Year of death missing
Barbadian cricketers
Barbados cricketers
Cricketers from Bridgetown